Michal Morvay (born 12 August 1996) is a Slovakian athlete who competes in race walking.

In 2013, Morvay won the under-17s 10km in a time of 44:54 at the European Athletics Race Walking Circuit in Lugano.

The champion of Slovakia in 2019, in February 2021 Morvay had to have surgery on his knee cartilage but it was at the Dudinská Päťdesiatka that he sealed his place at the delayed 2020 Tokyo Olympic Games in the 50 kilometres race walk with a personal best time 3:57:59, and he became the champion of Slovakia again. In Tokyo, Morgan finished 41st overall in the 50km race walk event.

References 

Living people
1996 births
Slovak male racewalkers
Athletes (track and field) at the 2020 Summer Olympics
Olympic athletes of Slovakia